The Mark–Houwink equation, also known as the Mark–Houwink–Sakurada equation or the Kuhn–Mark–Houwink–Sakurada equation or the Landau–Kuhn–Mark–Houwink–Sakurada equation or the Mark-Chrystian equation gives a relation between intrinsic viscosity  and molecular weight :

From this equation the molecular weight of a polymer can be determined from data on the intrinsic viscosity and vice versa.

For most flexible polymers, . For semi-flexible polymers, . For polymers with an absolute rigid rod, such as Tobacco mosaic virus, .

It is named after Herman F. Mark and Roelof Houwink.

Applications
In size-exclusion chromatography, such as gel permeation chromatography, the intrinsic viscosity of a polymer is directly related to the elution volume of the polymer. Then the molecular weight and intrinsic viscosity relationship is defined.

Also, the molecular weights of two different polymers in a particular solvent can be related using the Mark–Houwink equation when the polymer-solvent systems have the same intrinsic viscosity:

Knowing the Mark–Houwink parameters and the molecular weight of one of the polymers allows one to find the molecular weight of the other polymer using a GPC. The GPC sorts the polymer chains by volume and as intrinsic viscosity is related to the volume of the polymer chain, the GPC data is the same for the two different polymers. For example, if the GPC calibration curve is known for polystyrene in toluene, polyethylene in toluene can be run in a GPC and the molecular weight of polyethylene can be found according to the polystyrene calibration curve via the above equation.

References

Polymer chemistry